Neasa Hourigan (born October 1980) is an Irish Green Party politician who has been a Teachta Dála (TD) for the Dublin Central constituency since the 2020 general election. She was appointed Chair of the Committee on Budgetary Oversight in September 2020.

Early life
Hourigan was born in Limerick. Her father Michael Hourigan is a former Fine Gael member of Limerick City Council as well as a former Mayor of Limerick. Neasa was educated at Laurel Hill Coláiste FCJ. She graduated with a Bachelor of Architecture from Technological University Dublin, a Master of Architecture from University College Dublin, a Post Graduate Certificate in Higher Education and has lectured in sustainable communities, environmental design and green procurement at both Queen's University Belfast and Technological University Dublin.

Political career
Hourigan joined the Green Party in 2011. She was elected to represent Cabra-Glasnevin local electoral area on Dublin City Council at the 2019 local elections. She is the Green Party's Spokesperson for Finance and Health. 

Hourigan helped to establish the Irish Pedestrian Network born out of Dublin Blockers, a social media campaign she started in 2018 highlighting the issues pedestrians in Central Dublin were facing. Within this network, she organised an activist group, Streets are for People.

At the 2020 general election, Hourigan was elected as a TD for Dublin Central. Darcy Lonergan was then co-opted to Hourigan's seat on Dublin City Council.

On 22 July 2020, Hourigan was amongst several prominent members of the Green Party who formed the "Just Transition Greens", an affiliate group within the party with a green left/eco-socialist outlook, who have the objective of pressuring the party towards more hardline policies based on the concept of a Just Transition.

On 30 July 2020, Hourigan resigned as party whip of the Green Party, but did not leave the party after voting against the Government twice on amendments to the Residential Tenancies Bill. She was later sanctioned by party leader Eamon Ryan by having her speaking rights withdrawn for two months.

In December 2020 Hourigan, alongside fellow Green TD Patrick Costello, spoke out against the entry of Ireland into the Comprehensive Economic and Trade Agreement (CETA), a trade agreement between Canada and members of the EU, due to fears about the proposed "Investment court system". The investment court system is designed to act as a method of solving business disputes between investors and participating countries. Hourigan and Costello argued that the court system would allow Canadians investing in Ireland to sue the state if the state impeded their profits, such as with environmentalist laws, and this was a major threat to Ireland's sovereignty.

On 17 May 2022 Costello and Hourigan were both suspended from the Green Party for six months after they voted against the government on a motion calling for the new National Maternity Hospital to be built on land wholly owned by the state. Before the vote, Hourigan explained her rationale by saying she could not support the government's decision to approve plans to move the National Maternity Hospital from Holles Street to the St Vincent's Hospital campus due to concerns over the governance and ethos at a facility that will be built on a site ultimately leased from the Catholic Church. The government coalition parties (Fine Gael, Fianna Fáil and the Greens) had been whipped to abstain on the motion. Costello and Hourigan were re-admitted to the parliamentary party in November 2022.

On 7 March 2023, Hourigan criticised the government for the decision to end the eviction ban. She called the decision "heartless". Hourigan also spoke out against Green Party leader Eamon Ryan, saying that he did not speak to the party's policies. Senator and Green Party Chair Pauline O'Reilly rebuked Hourigan's remarks and said that it was "clear Neasa didn't have all the facts".

Personal life
Hourigan lives in Cabra, Dublin. She has three children, one of whom is hard of hearing and is registered as blind.

References

External links
Green Party profile

1980 births
Living people
Alumni of Dublin Institute of Technology
Alumni of Queen's University Belfast
Alumni of University College Dublin
Green Party (Ireland) TDs
Irish architects
Local councillors in Dublin (city)
Members of the 33rd Dáil
21st-century women Teachtaí Dála
Politicians from County Limerick